Panaeolus semiovatus var. phalaenarum is a common and widely distributed medium-sized grey mushroom that grows on dung.

Panaeolus semiovatus var. phalaenarum is often mistaken for Panaeolus semiovatus.

Taxonomy
The binomial Panaeolus antillarum that previously referred to a closely related species, is now reduced to synonymy with Panaeolus semiovatus var. phalaenarum by most authorities.

Description
Panaeolus semiovatus var. phalaenarum is a medium-sized mushroom which has a cap that is 2 to 4 cm, convex, and is white to yellowish. Often mistaken for its larger cousin Panaeolus semiovatus var. semiovatus, from which it differs in being more slender and having no annulus (ring).

This mushroom prefers tropical climates.

See also

List of Panaeolus species

References

External links
 Mushroom Observer - Panaeolus semiovatus var. phalaenarum
 Mushroom Observer - Panaeolus semiovatus var. phalaenarum

semiovatus var. phalaenarum